The James Hunter Stone House is located east of Adamsville, Ohio. The house was placed on the National Register of Historic Places on January 3, 1980.

References

Houses on the National Register of Historic Places in Ohio
Houses completed in 1835
Houses in Muskingum County, Ohio
National Register of Historic Places in Muskingum County, Ohio
Stone houses in Ohio